Rohingya refugees came to Nepal for asylum from Rakhine state of Myanmar. The Rohingyas entered Nepal in the 1990s and mainly in 2012. They came via eastern Nepal by crossing Bangladesh and India. They have been settled in Kapan at Kathmandu and various locations in Terai.

Population
The exact population of Rohingya in Nepal is unknown. The shelter in Kapan (rented land in Lasuntar and Hattigauda) at Kathmandu has 300 Rohingya refugees. The total number of Rohingya all over Nepal is estimated between 600  to 3000.

Legal status
Since Nepal has not signed the 1951 Refugee Convention or the 1967 Protocol, Nepal has no legal obligation to serve the refugees. However, Nepal has ratified human rights treaties such as specified by the Geneva Convention hence it is in position to guard the rights of Rohingya. Thus, Nepal does not recognize the Rohingya community as refugees but as illegal immigrants.

UN refugee agency provid them identity cards and Rs 5,000 allowance per family per month which does not meet their basic need.

Illegal activities
In 2015, five Rohingya refugees were found to illegally possess Nepalese passports issued in Morang. They successfully entered Saudi Arabia with these passports.

See also
Refugees in Nepal
Rohingya refugees in India

References

Refugees in Nepal
Rohingya diaspora